The name Iris was used for three tropical cyclones in the Atlantic Ocean.

 Tropical Storm Iris (1989) – Did not become strong or threaten land due to interaction with Hurricane Hugo, but dropped heavy rain on areas already drenched by Hugo.
 Hurricane Iris (1995) – moved up the Leeward Islands, causing four deaths on Martinique, later reached Europe as a strong extratropical storm.
 Hurricane Iris (2001) – struck Belize as a Category 4 storm, killing several in Central America, including 20 on a ship that capsized off the coast. Caused $66 million in damage to Belize.

The name Iris was retired after the 2001 season, and was replaced by Ingrid in the 2007 season.

The name Iris was also used for ten tropical cyclones in the Western Pacific Ocean.
 Typhoon Iris (1951) (T5104) – Category 5
 Typhoon Iris (1955) (T5519) – Category 1
 Typhoon Iris (1959) (T5908, 18W) – Category 2 which struck China.
 Tropical Storm Iris (1962) (T6204, 22W)
 Typhoon Iris (1964) (T6428, 43W) – Category 1 which struck Vietnam.
 Tropical Storm Iris (1967) (T6716, 18W)
 Typhoon Iris (1970) (T7018, 19W) – Category 3
 Typhoon Iris (1973) (T7310, 10W) – Category 2
 Typhoon Iris (1976) (T7620, 20W) – Category 1
 Tropical Storm Iris (1999) (02W, Bebeng, Japan Meteorological Agency analyzed it as a tropical depression, not as a tropical storm.)

The name Iris was also used for one tropical cyclone in the Southwest Indian Ocean.
 Cyclone Iris (1965)

The name Iris was also used for two tropical cyclones in the Southwest Pacific Ocean.
 Cyclone Iris (2000)
 Cyclone Iris (2018)

Atlantic hurricane set index articles
Pacific typhoon set index articles
South-West Indian Ocean cyclone set index articles
South Pacific cyclone set index articles